A Talking Picture is a 2003 Portuguese film written and directed by Manoel de Oliveira and starring Catherine Deneuve, John Malkovich, Irene Papas, Stefania Sandrelli and Leonor Silveira. This was Irene Papas’ final film before her death in 2022.

Plot
In July 2001, Rosa Maria, a university teacher, takes her little daughter Maria Joana on a cruise from their home country of Portugal to Bombay, India, to see Rosa's husband who is an airplane pilot.  Her motive is to visit the birthplaces of civilization. At each port, a new person boards the ship. A famous businesswoman boards in France, a famous model in Italy, and a famous actress in Athens. The captain of the ship invites the three distinguished women to dinner at his table, and they all speak in their own languages for the better part of the conversation. Later in the movie, Maria Joana and Rosa Maria are also invited to his table, where the captain presents the child  with a gift.

At dinner that night, the captain is informed that in Aden terrorists have planted two time bombs aboard the ship. The passengers are then ordered to evacuate.  Maria Joana runs back to her and her mother's cabin to get the Arab doll the captain presented her with earlier that evening. Rosa Maria realizes that Maria Joana is missing, runs to the cabin to find her, and takes her back on deck to board a life raft. Unfortunately, it is too late; all the life rafts have left.

The captain sees them on deck and yells for them to jump. As he is struggling to take off his uniform so he can swim to rescue them, there is the sound of two explosions and a bright light lights up the captain's face. The credits are displayed with the face of the distraught captain, lit up from the explosion, in the background.

Cast
Leonor Silveira as Rosa Maria
John Malkovich as Captain John Walesa
Stefania Sandrelli as Francesca
Catherine Deneuve as Delfina
Irene Papas as Helena
Filipa de Almeida as Maria Joana
Nikos Hatzopoulos as Father Ortodox
Luís Miguel Cintra as self
Michel Lubrano di Sbaraglione as fisherman
François Da Silva as fisherman's client
Antònio Ferraiolo as Cicerone Pompeia
Ricardo Trêpa as Cicerone at the Museum of Santa Sophia
 as official
 as Delfina's friend

Reception
On review aggregator website Rotten Tomatoes, the film has an approval rating of 76% based on 25 critics, with an average rating of 6.6/10. The site's critics' consensus states "A Talking Picture occasionally struggles to engagingly convey its ambitious themes, but viewers attuned to its distinctive frequencies will find it well worth a watch".

Walter V. Addiego of the San Francisco Chronicle called the film "A potent and troubling meditation on the state of Western society".

Writing for the Los Angeles Times, Kevin Thomas said that "Oliveira establishes a sense of timelessness only to catch his audience up short with a film that ultimately could scarcely be a more timely comment on the world in which we live".

Varietys Deborah Young said that "A film destined to divide Manoel de Oliveira's fans but also to win him new ones".

According to Manohla Dargis of The New York Times, "The Portuguese director Manoel de Oliveira again shows himself to be a master of the medium with this sharply cut gem of a film about a mother and daughter sailing the Mediterranean".

References

External links

Senses of Cinema Analysis

2000s Portuguese-language films
2000s English-language films
2000s French-language films
Greek-language films
2000s Italian-language films
Films directed by Manoel de Oliveira
Films produced by Paulo Branco
Portuguese multilingual films
2003 multilingual films